Little Girl is the debut album by American garage rock band Syndicate of Sound, and was released in 1966 on Bell Records, BELL 6001. It blended both garage and psychedelic rock influences.  The album was preceded by the single, "Little Girl".

Background 
After their single "Little Girl" rose up the charts to the number 8 position in summer of 1966, the Syndicate of Sound entered the studio to record an album. By the time of the album recording, Larry Ray had been replaced on lead guitar by Jim Sawyers. Half of the songs were penned by the group themselves, the remaining were covers from artists as diverse as The Hollies, The Sonics, Chuck Berry and Roy Orbison. John Sharkey has stated that each of the band members picked a song to cover and then they added "Big Boss Man", which was a regular part of their set-list. The album session also produced their follow-up single "Rumors", which peaked at number 55 on the Billboard Hot 100 charts on October 1, 1966.

Track listing 

 "Big Boss Man" (Luther Dixon, Al Smith) – 2:55
 "Almost Grown" (Chuck Berry) – 2:13
 "So Alone" (John Sharkey) – 3:05
 "Dream Baby" (Cindy Walker) – 2:34
 "Rumors" (Sharkey) – 2:06
 "Little Girl" (Don Baskin, Bob Gonzalez) – 2:25
 "That Kind of Man" (Baskin) – 2:18
 "I'm Alive" (Clint Ballard, Jr.) – 2:21
 "You" (Sharkey) – 2:42
 "Lookin' for the Good Times (The Robot)" (Sharkey) – 2:26
 "The Witch" (Gerald Roslie) – 2:33
 "Is You Is Or Is You Ain't My Baby" (Bill Austin, Louis Jordan) – 2:29

Bonus tracks on 1997 release 
 "The Upper Hand" (Baskin, Gonzalez) – 2:14
 "Mary" (Baskin) – 2:32
 "Keep It Up" (Baskin) – 2:44
 "Good Time Music" (Baskin) – 2:12

Personnel

Musicians 
 Don Baskin – vocals, guitar
 Jim Sawyers – lead guitar (tracks 1–5, 7–8, 10–12)
 Bob Gonzalez – bass guitar
 John Sharkey – keyboards
 John Duckworth – drums
 Larry Ray – lead guitar (tracks 6,9)

Technical 
 Garrie Thompson – producer
 Leo De Gar Kulka – engineer
 Chuck Patti – liner notes

Charts
Album – Billboard (United States)

Singles

References

External links 
 http://www.waybackattack.com/syndicateofsound.html
 Syndicate of Sound website

1966 debut albums
Bell Records albums